Tang-e Nadam (also Romanized as Tang-e Nadām; also known as Tangeh Nadām) is a village in Ladiz Rural District, in the Central District of Mirjaveh County, Sistan and Baluchestan Province, Iran. At the 2006 census, its population was 69, in 17 families.

References 

Populated places in Mirjaveh County